Nora Elena Yú Hernández (born 14 May 1954) is a Mexican politician affiliated with the Institutional Revolutionary Party. From 2014, she was a deputy of the LIX Legislature of the Mexican Congress representing Chihuahua.

References

1954 births
Living people
People from Ciudad Juárez
Women members of the Chamber of Deputies (Mexico)
Institutional Revolutionary Party politicians
21st-century Mexican politicians
21st-century Mexican women politicians
Politicians from Chihuahua (state)
University of Texas at El Paso alumni
Deputies of the LIX Legislature of Mexico
Members of the Chamber of Deputies (Mexico) for Chihuahua (state)